Leber is a surname, and may refer to:

 Ben Leber - American football player
 Georg Leber - German politician
 Jean Michel Constant Leber - French historian
 Julius Leber - German politician and resistance fighter 
 Theodor Leber - German ophthalmologist who first described the diseases now known as Leber's congenital amaurosis and Leber's hereditary optic neuropathy
 Titus Leber - Austrian film director
 Walter Philip Leber - former Panama Canal Zone Governor
 Wilhelm Leber - Chief Apostle of the New Apostolic Church
 Jonathan Leber - Austrian Politician of the FPÖ

See also
 Leber, Washington

Surnames